Egnatius may refer to:
 Gellius Egnatius, a leader of an ancient Italic tribe
 Gnaeus Egnatius, an ancient Roman aristocrat and senator
 Egnatius Lucillus, an ancient Roman aristocrat and senator
 Egnatius Lucillianus, an ancient Roman provincial governor
 Egnatius Victor Marinianus, an ancient Roman aristocrat
 Aulus Egnatius Priscillianus, an ancient Roman philosopher
 Aulus Egnatius Proculus, an ancient Roman aristocrat and senator
 Lucius Egnatius Victor, an ancient Roman aristocrat
 Lucius Egnatius Victor Lollianus, an ancient Roman aristocrat
 Marcus Egnatius Marcellinus, an ancient Roman aristocrat and senator
 Marcus Egnatius Postumus, an ancient Roman aristocrat and senator
 Publius Egnatius Celer, an ancient Roman philosopher
 Publius Licinius Egnatius Marinianus, an ancient Roman aristocrat
 Quintus Egnatius Gallienus Perpetuus, an ancient Roman aristocrat
 Quintus Egnatius Proculus, an ancient Roman aristocrat
 Quintus Egnatius Proculus (suffect consul 219), an ancient Roman aristocrat

 Egnatius, a monotypic genus of grasshoppers in the family Acrididae with the only species Egnatius apicalis

See also
 Egnatia gens